Paraclivina bipustulata is a species of ground beetle in the family Carabidae. It is found in the Caribbean, Central America, and North America.

References

Further reading

 
 
 
 
 
 
 

Scaritinae
Beetles described in 1798